Ernst & Young Tower may refer to:

 Ernst & Young Tower (Cleveland)
 EY Tower, in Toronto, Canada
 Latitude (building), Sydney formerly the Ernst & Young Tower